Peltula lobata is a species of foliose and saxicolous (rock-dwelling) lichen in the family Peltulaceae. Found in Portugal, it was formally described as a new species in 2013 by Joana Marques, Matthias Schultz, and Graciela Paz-Bermúdez. It also grows on quartzite and granite, but with lesser frequency. Characteristics of the lichen include its thick and elongated lobes, the presence of large apothecia with dark red opened discs, and by a complete absence of soredia.

References

Lichinomycetes
Lichen species
Lichens described in 2013
Lichens of Europe